Empty may refer to: ‍

Music

Albums 
 Empty (God Lives Underwater album) or the title song, 1995
 Empty (Nils Frahm album), 2020
 Empty (Tait album) or the title song, 2001

Songs 
 "Empty" (The Click Five song), 2007
 "Empty" (Garbage song), 2016
 "Empty" (Juice Wrld song), 2019
 "Empty", by Bebe Rexha from Better Mistakes, 2021
 "Empty", by Belmont from Belmont, 2018
 "Empty", by Blair St. Clair from Identity, 2020
 "Empty", by Boyinaband featuring Jaiden Animations, 2018
 "Empty", by Cooliecut, Kin$oul, Craig Xen, and Ski Mask the Slump God from Members Only, Vol. 4, 2019
 "Empty", by the Cranberries from No Need to Argue, 1994
 "Empty", by Harry Chapin from Heads & Tales, 1972
 "Empty", by King Gizzard & the Lizard Wizard from I'm in Your Mind Fuzz, 2014
 "Empty", by Metric from Live It Out, 2005
 "Empty", by Neurosis from Souls at Zero, 1992
 "Empty", by Olivia O'Brien, 2017
 "Empty", by Paul Kim, 2019
 "Empty", by Pvris from White Noise, 2014
 "Empty", by Raheem DeVaughn from Love Behind the Melody, 2008
 "Empty", by Ray LaMontagne from Till the Sun Turns Black, 2006
 "Empty", by Theatre of Tragedy from Forever Is the World, 2009
 "Empty", by Winner from 2014 S/S, 2014

Other 
 Empty (magazine), an Australian visual arts magazine
 Empty (TV series), a 2008 British sitcom

See also 
 
 
 Emptiness (disambiguation)
 Empty space (disambiguation)
 MT (disambiguation)